Qualfon, Inc. is a global provider of call center, back office, and business process outsourcing (BPO) services. Founded in 1995, Qualfon provides outsourcing services including call centers, customer service, customer acquisition and retention, customer on-boarding, as well as back-office processing. The company is privately held. Qualfon operates in the Philippines, Guyana, Mexico, the United States, China and India (Qualfon Technology Support Services LLP).

In March 2013, Qualfon acquired Data Control Group (DCG), which is now Qualfon Data Services Group (DSG), a division of Qualfon that performs back-office processing.

In May 2014, Qualfon acquired Center Partners, a United States contact center outsourcing company. Center Partners operates as a fully integrated part of Qualfon. 
The acquisition expanded Qualfon's operations with sales and technical support expertise, 2,500 additional employees, and six contact centers across Idaho, Washington, and Colorado.

In April 2016, Qualfon acquired Culture.Service.Growth (CSG), a contact center services company based in San Antonio, Texas. CSG expanded Qualfon's competency in property and casualty insurance, transportation and logistics, as well as retail services. The company now operates as a fully integrated part of Qualfon.

In December 2017, Qualfon acquired Dialog Direct, a BPO company that provides lead generation, sales, and customer support services to more than 100 clients in the automotive, retail, financial services, healthcare, and consumer packaged goods industries. Dialog Direct has more than 3,500 employees with ten locations in the United States and one location in Costa Rica. It also has an @home operation across the United States. With this sizable acquisition, Qualfon now has approximately 16,500 employees in 28 locations; 20 in the United States, 3 in the Philippines, 3 in Guyana, 1 in Mexico, and 1 in Costa Rica. It maintains a strong financial position enabling, Qualfon to continue to invest in future growth

References

Outsourcing companies